The 2015 Victorian Football League season was the 134th season of the Victorian Football Association/Victorian Football League Australian rules football competition.

Fifteen teams competing in the league. It was Williamstown's 14th top division premiership.

League membership
The size of the league reduced from sixteen teams to fifteen for the 2015 season, following the withdrawal and disbanding of the Bendigo Football Club. Bendigo had enjoyed stability from 2003 until 2012 in a reserves affiliation with the Australian Football League's , but following Essendon's establishment of a stand-alone reserves team in 2013, Bendigo had struggled to remain competitive as a stand-alone club. In June 2014, half-way through what would finish as its second consecutive winless season, the club concluded that it was not financially viable in the long term and announced it would play out the 2014 season before folding.

Premiership season
Specific feature of the fixture included:
 A Grand Final replay between Footscray and Box Hill Hawks headlining the opening round of a twenty-round season.
 At least two AFL curtain raiser games to be played, with the Northern Blues to face North Ballarat in Round 5 and Frankston in Round 11 as curtain raisers to  matches.
 Four night matches will be a feature of the season.
 Two matches, each between two AFL reserves teams, will be played in Bendigo at Queen Elizabeth Oval.
 The Seven Network to broadcast one match of the round live in Victoria, midday or 11.30am each weekend.

Source: VFL season 2015 Results and Fixtures

Round 1

Round 2

Round 3

Round 4

Round 5

Round 6

Round 7

Round 8

Round 9

Round 10

Round 11

Round 12

Round 13

Round 14

Round 15

Round 16

Round 17

Round 18

Round 19

Round 20

Ladder

Finals series

Qualifying and Elimination Finals

Semi-finals

Preliminary Finals

Grand Final

Awards
 The Frosty Miller Medal was won jointly by Sam Grimley, Jordan Lisle (Port Melbourne) and Liam McBean (Richmond), who each kicked 42 goals during the home-and-away season. It was Grimley's second consecutive joint Frosty Miller Medal, and the most players ever to tie for the award. Across the completed season including finals, Grimley was the leading goalkicker with 46.
The J. J. Liston Trophy was won by Nick Rippon (North Ballarat), who polled 15 votes. Four players – Myles Sewell (North Ballarat), Clint Jones (Sandringham), Matt Thomas (Richmond) and Sam Dunell (Williamstown) – finished equal second with 14 votes.
The Fothergill-Round Medal was won by Adam Marcon (Williamstown).
The Development League premiership was won by Williamstown. In the Grand Final, played at North Port Oval on 19 September as a curtain-raiser to the senior first preliminary final, Williamstown 8.13 (61) defeated Box Hill 8.12 (60) by one point; scores were level at 60 apiece when time expired, and Williamstown scored the winning behind after three minutes of golden point extra time. It was the third consecutive year that Williamstown defeated Box Hill in the Development League Grand Final, and the second time out of those three years that the final margin was one golden point.

Notable events
After having televised VFA/VFL matches weekly since the 1987 finals series, the Australian Broadcasting Corporation ended its broadcasting arrangement with the VFL. A new broadcast deal covering the 2015 and 2016 seasons was signed with the Seven Network, which televised the match of the round live into Melbourne as a lead-in to its AFL coverage.

See also 
 List of VFA/VFL premiers
 Australian rules football
 Victorian Football League
 Australian Football League
 2015 AFL season

References

External links
 2015 VFL Fixture
AFL Victoria website
Official VFL website

Victorian Football League seasons
VFL